Uperodon is a genus of microhylid frogs. They occur in South Asia (Pakistan, India, Sri Lanka, Bhutan, Nepal, and Bangladesh) and Myanmar. Uperodon reached its current composition in 2016 when the genus Ramanella was brought into its synonymy. The common names of these frogs are globular frogs and balloon frogs in reference to their stout appearance, or dot frogs, the last specifically referring to the former Ramanella.

Uperodon includes burrowing frogs that eat ants and termites.

Species
There are 12 recognized species:
 Uperodon anamalaiensis (Rao, 1937)
 Uperodon globulosus (Günther, 1864)
 Uperodon montanus (Jerdon, 1853)
 Uperodon mormoratus (Rao, 1937)
 Uperodon nagaoi (Manamendra-Arachchi and Pethiyagoda, 2001)
 Uperodon obscurus (Günther, 1864)
 Uperodon palmatus (Parker, 1934)
 Uperodon rohani Garg, Senevirathne, Wijayathilaka, Phuge, Deuti, Manamendra-Arachchi, Meegaskumbura, and Biju, 2018
 Uperodon systoma (Schneider, 1799)
 Uperodon taprobanicus (Parker, 1934)
 Uperodon triangularis (Günther, 1876)
 Uperodon variegatus (Stoliczka, 1872)

The AmphibiaWeb also lists Uperodon minor Rao, 1937, which is considered synonym of Uperodon anamalaiensis by the Amphibian Species of the World.

References

 
Microhylidae
Amphibian genera
Amphibians of Asia
Taxa named by André Marie Constant Duméril
Taxa named by Gabriel Bibron